Rock Valley may refer to:
Rock Valley College in Rockford, Illinois
Rock Valley College Starlight Theatre, a theatre run by the institution  
Rock Valley College Studio Theatre, another theatre run by the institution 
Rock Valley, Iowa, United States 
Rock Valley, Holyoke, Massachusetts, a neighborhood in Holyoke, Massachusetts
Rock Valley School, in the town of Hancock, New York is on the National Register of Historic Places